Waltraud Ernst (born 1955) is a German professor of the history of medicine at Oxford Brookes University. She is a specialist in the history of psychiatry.

She attended the University of Konstanz and obtained her PhD from the School of Oriental and African Studies in 1987 for a dissertation on psychiatry and mental illness in South Asia, c. 1780 – 1858.

Selected publications
 Race, Science and Medicine, 1700–1960. Routledge, New York, 1999. (Edited with Bernard Harris) 
 Plural Medicine, Tradition and modernity, 1800–2000. Routledge, London, 2002. (Editor) 
 Histories of the Normal and the Abnormal: Social and cultural histories of norms and normativity. Routledge, London, 2006. 
 Mad Tales from the Raj: Colonial Psychiatry in South Asia, 1800-58. Anthem Press, London, 2010. (Anthem South Asian Studies) 
 Colonialism and Transnational Psychiatry: The Development of an Indian Mental Hospital in British India, c. 1925 – 1940. Anthem Press, London, 2013. 
 Work, Psychiatry and Society, c.1750–2015. Manchester University Press, Manchester, 2016. (Editor)

References

External links

Living people
Academics of Oxford Brookes University
German women historians
1955 births
German medical historians
University of Konstanz alumni
Alumni of SOAS University of London